Noussair Mazraoui (born 14 November 1997) is a professional footballer who plays as a full-back for Bundesliga club Bayern Munich. Born in the Netherlands, he represents Morocco at international level.

Club career

Ajax
Mazraoui grew up in Alphen aan de Rijn and started playing for local club AVV Alphen at age 4. He moved to Alphense Boys three years later, where he only played for a year before being invited to play in the youth academy of Ajax. He made his professional debut with Jong Ajax on 12 August 2016 in an Eerste Divisie game against Almere City, replacing Richairo Živković after 86 minutes. On 25 October 2020, Mazraoui scored his first professional goal in a 3–1 victory against FC Midtjylland in the 2020–21 UEFA Champions League. He scored his first league goal in a 5–0 win against N.E.C..

Bayern Munich
On 24 May 2022, Mazraoui signed a four-year deal with Bayern Munich, starting from 1 July. In January 2023, he had an inflammation in his pericardium after suffering from Covid-19, which would rule him out for six to eight weeks.

International career
Mazraoui was a youth international for Morocco. He first played for the Moroccan national team in 2018.

On 10 November 2021, Mazraoui revealed that the relations between him and Moroccan national team coach Vahid Halilhodžić fell. On 13 March 2022, Mazraoui and his Moroccan teammate, Hakim Ziyech, both rejected Halilhodžić's invitation to represent Morocco in the 2022 FIFA World Cup qualification – CAF Third Round against DR Congo. He later accepted to join the national team and represented Morocco in the 2022 FIFA World Cup after Halilhodžić was replaced by Walid Regragui.

On 10 November 2022, he was named in Morocco's 26-man squad for the 2022 FIFA World Cup in Qatar. He played a role in Morocco's charge to the semi-finals, helping them become the first African side to reach the final 4 stage at the World Cup.

Career statistics

Club

International

Scores and results list Morocco's goal tally first.

Honours
Ajax
Eredivisie: 2018–19, 2020–21, 2021–22 
KNVB Cup: 2018–19, 2020–21
Johan Cruyff Shield: 2019

Bayern Munich
 DFL-Supercup: 2022

Individual
Eredivisie Talent of the Month: November 2018
Ajax Talent of the Year: 2019
Ajax Goal of the Season: 2021–22
Eredivisie Team of the Year: 2021–22

Orders
Order of the Throne: 2022

References

External links

 Profile at the FC Bayern Munich website
 Career stats – Voetbal International
 
 

1997 births
Living people
People from Leiderdorp
Citizens of Morocco through descent
Moroccan footballers
Dutch footballers
Dutch sportspeople of Moroccan descent
Association football defenders
AFC Ajax players
Jong Ajax players
FC Bayern Munich footballers
Eredivisie players
Eerste Divisie players
Bundesliga players
2019 Africa Cup of Nations players
2022 FIFA World Cup players
Morocco international footballers
Morocco youth international footballers
Morocco under-20 international footballers
Footballers from South Holland
Moroccan expatriate footballers
Expatriate footballers in Germany
Moroccan expatriate sportspeople in Germany
Dutch expatriate sportspeople in Germany
Dutch expatriate footballers